The 2002 season was the Kansas City Chiefs' 33rd in the National Football League (NFL), their 43rd overall and the franchise's 40th in Kansas City, Missouri.

In their second season under head coach Dick Vermeil, the Chiefs's high-powered offense was led by quarterback Trent Green and 2002 NFL Offensive Player of the Year Priest Holmes, who was named to the NFL All-Pro team for the second of three years in a row. Green had a 2-to-1 touchdown-to-interception ratio (26 to 13) and Holmes led the league in touchdowns (24) and overall scoring (144 points).

Kansas City scored 467 points (29.2 per game), but gave up 399 points (24.9 per game), the second most in the AFC and fifth-most in the NFL. Football Outsiders stated that the 2002 Chiefs have the second-largest Offense-Defense imbalance from 1992–2010  (the largest discrepancy coming from the 1992 Seattle Seahawks). Football Outsiders also calculated that the Chiefs had the second most efficient running game in the same period (second only to the 2000 St. Louis Rams).

The Chiefs' offense also set two new NFL records with the fewest fumbles in a season (7, broken in 2010) and fewest fumbles lost in a season (2), the latter of which still stands.

Offseason

NFL draft

Undrafted free agents

Personnel

Staff

Roster

Preseason

Regular season
In the 2002 season, the Chiefs' non-divisional, conference opponents were primarily from the AFC East. The Cleveland Browns were from the AFC North and the Jacksonville Jaguars were from the AFC South. Their non-conference opponents were from the NFC West.

Schedule

Note: Intra-division opponents are in bold text.

Game summaries

Week 1: at Cleveland Browns

Week 2: vs. Jacksonville Jaguars

Week 3: at New England Patriots

Week 4: vs. Miami Dolphins

Week 5: at New York Jets

Week 6: at San Diego Chargers

Week 7: vs. Denver Broncos

Week 8: vs. Oakland Raiders

Week 10: at San Francisco 49ers

Week 11: vs. Buffalo Bills

Week 12: at Seattle Seahawks

Week 13: vs. Arizona Cardinals

Week 14: vs. St. Louis Rams

Week 15: at Denver Broncos

Week 16: vs. San Diego Chargers

Week 17: at Oakland Raiders

Standings

References

Kansas City Chiefs
Kansas City Chiefs seasons
Kansas